Major Sydney Vincent Sippe  (pronounced -ee) (24 April 1889 – 17 November 1968) was a British pioneer aviator. He designed, built, and tested early aeroplanes, being the first pilot to take off from the sea in Britain. He flew many missions in World War I, including some of the first ever bombing raids. He won honours from several countries, particularly for his part in the 1914 bombing of a German Zeppelin factory.

Early life
Sippe's parents were Charles Henry Sippe (1842–1924), a shipping export agent (whose firm, C H Sippe & Sons Ltd, still existed until c.2013), and Elizabeth Jane Thornton (born 1846). They had moved to Britain from Australia, both families having originally emigrated from Liverpool.

The youngest of nine children, Sydney Sippe was born in 1889 in Brixton, London, where his parents lived at 17 Lambert Road. He was educated at Dulwich College from May 1903 to December 1905.

Name and title
Sippe was named after Sydney, Australia, where both his parents had lived. His first name is often misspelled 'Sidney', even on official documents, and his surname sometimes written with an accent, 'Sippé', as if of French origin. The form 'Sydney Vincent Sippe' is used both on his birth and death certificates.

Following his service during World War I, Sippe continued to use the title major – and was known as 'the Major' – even though the RAF rank was renamed squadron leader in 1919. He also went by the nickname Pi (pronounced like 'pie'), and was known to his family as Pipi.

Aviation pioneer
After leaving school, in February 1906 Sippe became an engineering apprentice with British Westinghouse in Manchester.

Between late 1909 and early 1910, just a year after Wilbur Wright first demonstrated powered flight in Europe, Sippe (aged 20), his brother Arthur, and their friend James Jensen (or Jenson) designed and built a monoplane from steel tubing.  Its attempted maiden flight on 24 April 1910 at Addington, Croydon, failed due to insufficient power:

Sydney Sippe was thrown forward with some violence and his nose came into collision with one of the steel tubes. The nose came off worst, and a piece of flesh was removed from the inside of his thigh. That, with sundry bruises, was all. A well-meaning friend rushed up with a flask of whisky, which he thrust into the pilot's mouth, and so Sydney Sippe arrived home to his mother with a broken nose, a bleeding thigh—and slightly intoxicated.

He learned to fly at the Avro school at Brooklands, gaining his licence in January 1912 "in a way which showed that he had thoroughly mastered the art". He immediately became a test and demonstration pilot. Three weeks after his flying test he survived a crash near Finchampstead caused by a frozen carburettor; the aircraft was wrecked, but Sippe escaped unhurt.

In the spring of 1912 he test-flew the Avro hydro-aeroplane at Barrow-in-Furness, making the first ever flight from the sea in Britain on 2 April.

He shortly afterwards tested a monoplane for Hanriot in France. Engine failure forced him to land in a cornfield; the plane ended up upside down, but was undamaged, and he flew it again in the first Aerial Derby. This was a race round London, competing against various European pilots including Thomas Sopwith. Engine trouble forced Sippe out of the race.

Later that year he supervised the construction of aircraft in Milan for the Bristol Aeroplane Company, and took part in an Italian long-distance flying competition. On his return to the UK he took up flight testing and instruction at Salisbury.

War service
In 1914, at the outbreak of World War I, Sippe immediately joined up and was made a Flight Lieutenant in the Royal Navy Air Service. He took part in the Entente's very first bombing raids on Düsseldorf and Cologne; in the latter, after failing to find his designated target, he instead bombed Cologne railway station, causing serious damage.

Friedrichshafen raid
This was followed by a celebrated attack on the Zeppelin sheds and factories at Friedrichshafen, Germany on 21 November 1914, one of the first long-distance bombing missions. Sippe and two other pilots flew  from Belfort, France, over mountainous terrain and in difficult weather—a risky flight near the limit of the aircraft's range. The distance was increased by the need to avoid flying over neutral Switzerland.

Reaching the target area, Sippe crossed Lake Constance in mist while under heavy fire, descending to just ten feet above the water so as to use the mist as cover. Despite their aircraft taking damage, the three pilots succeeded in bombing their targets. Although substantial damage was claimed at the time and in some later histories, the damage inflicted was slight.

One pilot was shot down and captured, but Sippe and the third pilot returned safely.

The raid was announced by Winston Churchill, then First Lord of the Admiralty, who called it "a fine feat of arms". One historian concluded: "The pilots deserve all praise for their admirable navigation... this flight of 250 miles, into gunfire, across enemy country, in the frail little Avro with its humble horse-power, can compare as an achievement with the best of them".

The bullet-damaged tail of Sippe's (or possibly one of the other pilots') plane was later mounted on a plaque as a souvenir.

Honours
Sippe and the other returning pilot received the French Legion of Honour (rarely given to foreigners) immediately after the Friedrichshafen raid, at the request of General Joffre himself. Sippe was awarded the Distinguished Service Order in the 1915 New Year Honours, and the OBE in the 1919 New Year's Honours. He was also awarded the Croix de Guerre, and made a Chevalier of the Belgian Order of Leopold.

Sippe was mentioned in dispatches six times during the war.

Cigarette cards
Sippe was featured on at least two cigarette cards: one, with his photograph and short biography, no. 26 in a series of 50 Naval Portraits, was issued by Lambert and Butler in c.1917. Another, no. 2 in a series of 50 War Incidents, was issued by Wills. Both cards recounted the Friedrichshafen raid.

Family
In December 1915, Sippe married Mabel Frances D'Arcy, only child of Gerald d'Arcy of Dublin; they had two children, Angela and James, and four grandchildren. They subsequently separated, and were divorced in 1933 on the grounds of her adultery with a Greek man.

Post-war life
After World War I, Sippe went through a variety of jobs, mostly related to engineering or aviation.

In the early 1920s he trained pilots in Japan.

In 1922 he began a secret attempt to salvage what was thought to be £2 million worth of gold coins (£100 million in 2012 prices) from the SS Tubantia, a ship which sank off the Dutch coast in 1916. When a rival salvage operation started the following year, Sippe won a landmark court case which ruled that, as his divers had found the ship and started work, he had the sole right to salvage it. In 1925, after £100,000 (£5.2 million in 2012 prices) had been spent on the salvage attempt, he concluded that though the cargo had been in the ship, the difficulty of accessing it made it too dangerous for divers to recover, and so the project was abandoned.

Sippe was a sales manager for ten years with Short Brothers (now a large aerospace business), then with Crossley Motors, followed by the Fairey Aviation Company from 1946 to 1955. He later founded his own business, Field and Forest Supplies, selling products of his own invention. In 1963 he became a consultant to the 20th Century Joinery and Packing Co Ltd, a company which specialized in packing aircraft parts for transport.

He died of cancer in 1968 in Leatherhead Hospital. Despite Sippe's distinguished war record, it seems no obituary appeared in any major newspapers, as they were not aware of his death at the time.

References

1889 births
1968 deaths
British World War I pilots
20th-century British inventors
Chevaliers of the Légion d'honneur
People educated at Dulwich College
Companions of the Distinguished Service Order
Recipients of the Croix de Guerre 1914–1918 (France)
Royal Naval Air Service aviators
Royal Air Force officers
Officers of the Order of the British Empire